Bahishti Maqbara (English: The Heavenly Graveyard), located originally in Qadian, India, and then in Rabwah, Pakistan, is a religious cemetery established by the Ahmadiyya Community as a directive from the community's founder Mirza Ghulam Ahmad, made known in his booklet Al-Wasiyyat. Mirza Ghulam Ahmad established it in his will after he saw an angel showing him the place of his burial.

History
In 1905, Mirza Ghulam Ahmad, founder of the Ahmadiyya Community, wrote a publication titled Al-Wassiyat (English: The Will). In it, he describes establishing a cemetery for members of the community who are more spiritual than materialistic. At the time, finding a suitable piece of land in and around Qadian was costly, and, as such, Mirza Ghulam Ahmad proposed a piece of land from his own property.

He also proposed that for anyone to be buried in Bahishti Maqbara, the following three requirements be fulfilled:

Allegations

Locations
To date, there are two cemeteries dedicated as Bahisti Maqbara. The first is located in Qadian, India and the second, in Rabwah, Pakistan.

Qadian
On 26 May 1908, Mirza Ghulam Ahmad died and was taken by train to Batala. From there, he was carried to Qadian where he was eventually buried in Bahisti Maqbara. Thousands of members of the community arrived in Qadian for funeral prayers while prominent leaders within the community unanimously agreed Hakeem Noor-ud-Din should lead the community as the first successor to Mirza Ghulam Ahmad. As Khalifatul Masih, Hakeem Noor-ud-Din led the funeral prayer for Mirza Ghulam Ahmad the same day.

Rabwah

Although the original cemetery was established in Qadian, after the partition of India when the community moved its headquarters to Rabwah (Pakistan), another branch of the cemetery was established there.

Notable Burials

Frequently visited sites in the cemetery include the grave of Mirza Basheer-ud-Din Mahmood Ahmad and Mirza Nasir Ahmad, the second and third Caliphs of the Ahmadiyya Muslim Community and successor of Mirza Ghulam Ahmad.

Nobel laureate Abdus Salam was buried in Bahishti Maqbara, Rabwah next to his parents' graves. The epitaph on his tomb initially read "First Muslim Nobel Laureate" but due to Salam's adherence to the Ahmadiyya Muslim Community, the word "Muslim" was later erased on the orders of a local magistrate under Ordinance XX which declares Ahmadis non-Muslims. After his death on 21 November 1996, over 13,000 visited to pay their last respects and over 30,000 people attended his funeral prayers.

Muhammad Zafarullah Khan, Pakistan's first Asian President of the International Court of Justice is also buried in Bahishti Maqbara, Rabwah.

References

Ahmadiyya buildings and structures
Cemeteries in India
Gurdaspur district
Ahmadiyya in Pakistan
Cemeteries in Punjab, Pakistan